Alexandra Stewart (born June 10, 1939) is a Canadian actress.

Biography

Born in Montreal, Quebec, Stewart left for Paris, France, in 1958, to study art. Within a year, she made her film debut in Les Motards, and has since then enjoyed a steady career in both French- and English-language films.

Besides her cinema career, Stewart regularly appeared on television in shows such as Les Jeux de 20 heures and L'Académie des neuf. She has also appeared in the 1981 cartoon Space Stars and had cameos in Highlander: The Series, The Saint and  Danger Man (TV Series) . Notably, she is also the English-language narrator of Chris Marker's 1983 documentary, Sans Soleil. She was part of the jury of the 2004 Chicago International Film Festival.

Personal life

Stewart had a daughter, Justine, with the French director Louis Malle.

Selected filmography

1956: Women's Club (by Ralph Habib) (uncredited)
1959: Les Motards (by Jean Laviron) as La speakerine
1959: Les Liaisons dangereuses as Une amie de Miguel (uncredited)
1959: Two Men in Manhattan as Minor Role (uncredited)
1960: L'eau a la bouche as Séraphine Brett-Juval, aka Fifine
1960: Le Bel âge (by Pierre Kast) as Alexandra
1960: Tarzan the Magnificent as Lori
1960: Trapped by Fear as Véra
1960: Thank You, Natercia as Sandra
1960: Exodus (by Otto Preminger) as Jordana Ben Canaan
1961: The End of Belle as Belle Shermann
1961: Les Mauvais Coups as Hélène
1961: La Morte-Saison des amours as Sandra
1962: Une grosse tête (by Claude de Givray) as Françoise
1962: Climats (by Stellio Lorenzi) as Misa
1962: Le rendez-vous de minuit as Jacqueline
1962: Homage at Siesta Time as Marianne Graham
1963:  (by Franz Peter Wirth) as Prinzessin
1963: Ro.Go.Pa.G. as Alexandra (segment "Il nuovo mondo")
1963: Violenza segreta as Elisabetta
1963:  (by Will Tremper) as Juanita
1963: Le Feu follet (by Louis Malle) as Solange
1963: Dragées au poivre (by Jacques Baratier) as Anna, la fille de couverture
1963:  (by Alfred Weidenmann) as Rektorengattin
1964:  (by Camillo Mastrocinque) as Laura
1965: Man Called Gringo (by Roy Rowland) as Lucy Walton
1965: Mickey One (by Arthur Penn) as Jenny
1965: Thrilling (by Ettore Scola) as Frida (segment "Il vittimista")
1966: Marcia nuziale as Nancy
1967: Maroc 7 (by Gerry O'Hara) as Michelle Craig
1967: La loi du survivant as Hèléne
1968: L'Écume des Jours as Isis
1968: La mariée était en noir (by François Truffaut) as Mlle Becker
1968: Only When I Larf (by Basil Dearden) as Liz
1969: Bye bye, Barbara as Eve Michelli
1969: Waiting for Caroline (by Ron Kelly) as Caroline
1969: Umano, non umano (by Mario Schifano) as Marina
1970: Slap in the Face (by Rolf Thiele) as Celestine
1970: The Man Who Had Power Over Women (by John Krish) as Frances
1970: Kemek as Marisa Love
1970: Ils as Hélène Jeanteur
1971: Ciel bleu
1971: Zeppelin (by Etienne Périer) as Stephanie
1971: Valparaiso, Valparaiso as La paysanne
1971: Où est passé Tom? as Alexandra
1972: Les soleils de l'île de Pâques as Alexandra
1972:  (by Philippe Tolédano) as Jean's Wife
1973: Sugar Cookies (uncredited)
1973: Because of the Cats (by Fons Rademakers) as Feodora
1973: Day for Night (by François Truffaut) as Stacey
1974: Bingo (by Jean-Claude Lord) as Hélène
1974: The Marseille Contract (by Robert Parrish) as Rita
1975: The Heatwave Lasted Four Days as Barbara Lawrence
1975: Black Moon (by Louis Malle) as Sister Lily
1976:  (by Pierre Kast) as Alexandra
1977:  (by Philippe de Broca) as Delphine
1977: The Uncanny (by Claude Héroux) as Mrs. Blake (segment "Quebec Province 1975")
1977: Good-bye, Emmanuelle (by François Leterrier) as Dorothée
1978: La petite fille en velours bleu (by Alan Bridges) as Théo Casarès
1978: In Praise of Older Women (by George Kaczender) as Paula
1980:  (by Pierre Kast) as Sandra
1980: Agency (by George Kaczender) as Mimi
1980: Phobia (by John Huston) as Barbara Grey
1980: Final Assignment as Sam O'Donnell
1981: Help Me Dream as Magda
1981: The Last Chase (by Martyn Burke) as Eudora
1981: Les Uns et les autres (by Claude Lelouch) as Alexandra
1981: Madame Claude 2 (by François Mimet) as Mme Claude
1981: Chanel Solitaire as Nathalie
1981: Your Ticket Is No Longer Valid as Clara
1982: Cercasi Gesù as Francesca's mother
1982: Chassé-croisé as Une femme sculpteur
1982: Le choc as La femme de la première victime (uncredited)
1982: La guérilléra as Alexandrine
1983: Femmes (by Tana Kaleya and Deva Tanmayo) as Alexandra
1984: Le Bon Plaisir as Julie Hoffman
1984: Charlots Connection (by Jean Couturier) as Liane
1984: The Blood of Others (TV Movie, by Claude Chabrol) as Madeleine
1986: Peau d'ange as Héléna Werner
1987: Under The Cherry Moon (by Prince) as Mrs. Sharon
1988: Frantic (by Roman Polanski) as Edie
1988: The Passenger – Welcome to Germany as Mrs.
1989: Les Jeux de société (TV Movie)
1990: Monsieur (by Jean-Philippe Toussaint) as Mme Dubois-Lacour
1995: Le Fils de Gascogne (by Pascal Aubier)
1996: Seven Servants (by Daryush Shokof) as Hilda
2000: La Candide Madame Duff (by Jean-Pierre Mocky) as Tante Lou
2000: Sous le sable (by François Ozon) as Amanda
2001: Fifi martingale (by Jacques Rozier) as L'ambassadrice
2002: Les filles, personne s'en méfie as La femme cliente
2003: Rien, voilà l'ordre as Alexandra Stewart
2005: Mon petit doigt m'a dit... (by Pascal Thomas) as Mme Boscovan
2005: El cantor as Edna
2007: Fallen Heroes as La madre di Bruno
2009: Bazar as Joanna
2011: Ma compagne de nuit as La mère de Julia
2011: The Hidden Face as Emma
2013: Merry Christmas as Maya Dawn Lewis
2014: Valentin Valentin (by Pascal Thomas) as Sylvia
2015: La duchesse de Varsovie as Nina
2019: À cause des filles..? as La mère de la mariée

Recognition
 From 23 to 25 November 1990, Alexandra Stewart presided over the 14th Festival international du film de création super 8 de Metz organised by Claude Kunowitz in partnership with the Mairie de Metz.

References

External links 
 
  Article published in The Gazette (Montreal), July 14, 1973.

1939 births
Actresses from Montreal
Anglophone Quebec people
Canadian film actresses
Canadian television actresses
Canadian voice actresses
Canadian expatriates in France
Living people
Signatories of the 1971 Manifesto of the 343